The Red Battalions were urban workers who were recruited by the Constitutionalist forces of the Mexican Revolution to fight against the Zapatistas and Pancho Villa's army. The Mexican Revolution was a civil war that saw various alliances between different forces who fought various political reasons. The Red Battalions belonged largely to the Casa del Obrero Mundial ("house of the world worker"), an anarcho-syndicalist workers' organization. The battalions were deployed by Carranza in exchange for various rights for workers, to defeat the "peasant counterrevolutionaries" of Zapata and Villa. They were called the Red Battalions because of their left-wing membership.

The battalions were ultimately disbanded after Carranza no longer required their forces to subdue the insurgents of the north and the peasant guerrillas of the south. On 13 January 1916, amidst strikes incited by the Casa Obrera Mundial, Carranza ordered the last of the Red Battalions to dissolve. Thereafter all labor unrest was suppressed, often violently, and the Casa went into decline.

See also

Casa del Obrero Mundial
Index of Mexico-related articles
Mexican Revolution

References

Further reading
Carr, Barry. "The Casa del Obrero Mundial. Constitutionalism and the pact of February 1915" in El Trabajo y los trabajadores, 603-32.

Hart, John Mason. Anarchism and the Mexican Working Class, 1880-1931. Austin: University of Texas Press 1978.
Hart, John Mason. "The urban working class and the Mexican Revolution. The case of the Casa del Obrero Mundial", Hispanic American Historical Review vol. 58, no. 1, 1-20.
Meyer, Jean A. "Les Ouvrier dans la révolution mexicane. Les Bataillons rouges". Annales: Économies, Sociétes, Civilisations. vol. 25, no. 1 1970, 30-55.

Factions of the Mexican Revolution
Left-wing militant groups in Mexico